{{DISPLAYTITLE:Psi3 Piscium}}

Psi3 Piscium, which is Latinized from ψ3 Piscium, is a solitary, yellow-hued star in the zodiac constellation of Pisces. It is faintly visible to the naked eye, having an apparent visual magnitude of 5.562. At that distance, the visual magnitude is diminished by an extinction factor of 0.33 due to interstellar dust. The star is drifting closer to the Sun with a radial velocity of −7 km/s.

This F-type giant is a candidate horizontal branch star with a stellar classification of F9 IIIa. It has 2.8 times the mass of the Sun and 10.3 times the Sun's radius. The star is radiating 95.5 times the luminosity of the Sun from its enlarged photosphere at an effective temperature of 6,554 K.

References

F-type giants
Horizontal-branch stars
Piscium, Psi³
Pisces (constellation)
Durchmusterung objects
Piscium, 081
006903
005454
0339